In Memory is Nevermore's only EP. It was recorded in April and May 1996 and released on July 23, 1996. It features a Bauhaus medley. It was re-issued in 2006 with 5 bonus tracks, which are all demos of songs from the next full-length album, The Politics of Ecstasy.

Matricide and The Sorrowed Man had both been previously recorded under the titles Mother Earth and Forever, respectively, in a 1990 demo by Sanctuary, as well as with their current titles in the 1992 Nevermore demo entitled Utopia.

It was their first album to feature Pat O'Brien on rhythm guitars and also the first in which Van Williams played all drum tracks.

Track listing

Personnel
Nevermore
Warrel Dane - vocals
Jeff Loomis - guitar
Pat O'Brien - guitar
Jim Sheppard - bass
Van Williams - drums

Tracks 6-10 performances
Warrel Dane - vocals
Jeff Loomis - guitar, bass, drum programming

Production
Neil Kernon - produced, recorded and mixed

Perry Cunningham - remastering (2006 reissue)

References

External links

1996 EPs
Nevermore albums
Century Media Records EPs